

List of dioceses in Africa

Episcopal Conference of Algeria

Ecclesiastical Province of Alger
Archdiocese of Alger
Diocese of Constantine
Diocese of Oran

Episcopal Conference of Angola 
 See also List of Catholic dioceses in Angola

Ecclesiastical Province of Huambo
Archdiocese of Huambo
Diocese of Benguela
Diocese of Kwito-Bié

Ecclesiastical Province of Luanda
Archdiocese of Luanda
Diocese of Cabinda
Diocese of Caxito
Diocese of Mbanza Congo
Diocese of Sumbe
Diocese of Viana

Ecclesiastical Province of Lubango
Archdiocese of Lubango
Diocese of Menongue
Diocese of Ondjiva

Ecclesiastical Province of Malanje
Archdiocese of Malanje
Diocese of Ndalatando
Diocese of Uije

Ecclesiastical Province of Saurímo
Archdiocese of Saurímo
Diocese of Dundo
Diocese of Lwena

Ecclesiastical Conference of Benin

Ecclesiastical Province of Cotonou
Archdiocese of Cotonou
Diocese of Abomey
Diocese of Dassa-Zoumé
Diocese of Lokossa
Diocese of Porto Novo

Ecclesiastical Province of Parakou
Archdiocese of Parakou
Diocese of Abomey
Diocese of Djougou
Diocese of Kandi
Diocese of Natitingou
Diocese of N’Dali

Ecclesiastical Conference of Burkina Faso

Ecclesiastical Province of Bobo-Dioulasso
Archdiocese of Bobo-Dioulasso
Diocese of Banfora
Diocese of Dédougou
Diocese of Diébougou
Diocese of Nouna

Ecclesiastical Province of Koupéla
Archdiocese of Koupéla
Diocese of Dori
Diocese of Fada N’Gourma
Diocese of Kaya

Ecclesiastical Province of Ouagadougou
Archdiocese of Ouagadougou
Diocese of Koudougou
Diocese of Manga
Diocese of Ouahigouya

Ecclesiastical Conference of Burundi

Ecclesiastical Province of Bujumbura
Archdiocese of Bujumbura
Diocese of Bubanza
Diocese of Bururi

Ecclesiastical Province of Gitega
Archdiocese of Gitega
Diocese of Muyinga
Diocese of Ngozi
Diocese of Ruyigi

Ecclesiastical Conference of Cameroon

Ecclesiastical Province of Bamenda
Archdiocese of Bamenda
Diocese of Buéa
Diocese of Kumbo
Diocese of Mamfe

Ecclesiastical Province of Bertoua
Archdiocese of Bertoua
Diocese of Batouri
Diocese of Doumé–Abong’ Mbang
Diocese of Yokadouma

Ecclesiastical Province of Douala
Archdiocese of Douala
Diocese of Bafoussam
Diocese of Edéa
Diocese of Eséka
Diocese of Nkongsamba

Ecclesiastical Province of Garoua
Archdiocese of Garoua
Diocese of Maroua-Mokolo
Diocese of Ngaoundéré
Diocese of Yagoua

Ecclesiastical Province of Yaoundé
Archdiocese of Yaoundé
Diocese of Bafia
Diocese of Ebolowa
Diocese of Kribi
Diocese of Mbalmayo
Diocese of Obala
Diocese of Sangmélima

Episcopal Conference of the Central African Republic

Ecclesiastical Province of Bangui
Archdiocese of Bangui
Diocese of Alindao
Diocese of Bambari
Diocese of Bangassou
Diocese of Berbérati
Diocese of Bossangoa
Diocese of Bouar
Diocese of Kaga-Bandoro
Diocese of Mbaïki

Episcopal Conference of Chad

Ecclesiastical Province of N'Djamena
Archdiocese of N'Djamena
Diocese of Doba
Diocese of Goré
Diocese of Lai
Diocese of Moundou
Diocese of Pala
Diocese of Sarh
Prelature of Mongo

Episcopal Conference of the Republic of the Congo

Ecclesiastical Province of Brazzaville
Archdiocese of Brazzaville
Diocese of Dolisie
Diocese of Gamboma
Diocese of Impfondo
Diocese of Kinkala
Diocese of Nkayi
Diocese of Ouesso
Diocese of Owando
Diocese of Pointe-Noire

Episcopal Conference of the Democratic Republic of the Congo

Ecclesiastical Province of Bukavu
Archdiocese of Bukavu
Diocese of Butembo-Beni
Diocese of Goma
Diocese of Kasongo
Diocese of Kindu
Diocese of Uvira

Ecclesiastical Province of Kananga
Archdiocese of Kananga
Diocese of Kabinda
Diocese of Kole
Diocese of Luebo
Diocese of Luiza
Diocese of Mbujimayi
Diocese of Mweka
Diocese of Tshumbe

Ecclesiastical Province of Kinshasa
Archdiocese of Kinshasa
Diocese of Boma
Diocese of Idiofa
Diocese of Kenge
Diocese of Kikwit
Diocese of Kisantu
Diocese of Matadi
Diocese of Popokabaka

Ecclesiastical Province of Kisangani
Archdiocese of Douala
Diocese of Bondo
Diocese of Bunia
Diocese of Buta
Diocese of Doruma-Dungu
Diocese of Isangi
Diocese of Isiro-Niangara
Diocese of Mahagi-Nioka
Diocese of Wamba

Ecclesiastical Province of Lubumbashi
Archdiocese of Lubumbashi
Diocese of Kalemie-Kirungu
Diocese of Kamina
Diocese of Kilwa-Kasenga
Diocese of Kolwezi
Diocese of Kongolo
Diocese of Manono
Diocese of Sakania-Kipushi

Ecclesiastical Province of Mbandaka-Bikoro
Archdiocese of Mbandaka-Bikoro
Diocese of Basankusu
Diocese of Bokungu-Ikela
Diocese of Budjala
Diocese of Lisala
Diocese of Lolo
Diocese of Molegbe

Episcopal Conference of Côte d’Ivoire

Ecclesiastical Province of Abidjan
Archdiocese of Abidjan
Diocese of Agboville
Diocese of Grand-Bassam
Diocese of Yopougon

Ecclesiastical Province of Bouaké
Archdiocese of Bouaké
Diocese of Abengourou
Diocese of Bondoukou
Diocese of Yamoussoukro

Ecclesiastical Province of Gagnoa
Archdiocese of Gagnoa
Diocese of Daloa
Diocese of Man
Diocese of San Pedro-en-Côte d'Ivoire

Ecclesiastical Province of Korhogo
Archdiocese of Korhogo
Diocese of Katiola
Diocese of Odienné

Episcopal Conference of Equatorial Guinea

Ecclesiastical Province of Malabo
Archdiocese of Malabo
Diocese of Bata
Diocese of Ebebiyin

Episcopal Conference of Eritrea

Ecclesiastical Province of Asmara
Archeparchy of Asmara
Eparchy of Barentu
Eparchy of Keren
Eparchy of Segheneyti

Episcopal Conference of Ethiopia and Eritrea

Ecclesiastical Province of Addis Abeba
Archeparchy of Addis Abeba
Eparchy of Adigrat
Eparchy of Bahir Dar-Dessie
Eparchy of Emdeber

Episcopal Conference of Gabon

Ecclesiastical Province of Libreville
Archdiocese of Libreville
Diocese of Franceville
Diocese of Mouila
Diocese of Oyem
Diocese of Port-Gentil

Episcopal Conference of Ghana

Ecclesiastical Province of Accra
Archdiocese of Accra
Diocese of Ho
Diocese of Jasikan
Diocese of Keta-Akatsi
Diocese of Koforidua

Ecclesiastical Province of Cape Coast
Archdiocese of Cape Coast
Diocese of Sekondi-Takoradi
Diocese of Wiawso

Ecclesiastical Province of Kumasi
Archdiocese of Kumasi
Diocese of Goaso
Diocese of Konongo-Mampong
Diocese of Obuasi
Diocese of Sunyani

Ecclesiastical Province of Tamale
Archdiocese of Tamale
Diocese of Damongo
Diocese of Navrongo-Bolgatanga
Diocese of Wa
Diocese of Yendi

Episcopal Conference of Guinea

Ecclesiastical Province of Conakry
Archdiocese of Conakry
Diocese of Kankan
Diocese of N’Zérékoré

Episcopal Cenference of Guinea-Bissau
List of Catholic dioceses in Guinea-Bissau

Episcopal Conference of Kenya

Ecclesiastical Province of Kisumu
Archdiocese of Kisumu
Diocese of Bungoma
Diocese of Eldoret
Diocese of Homa Bay
Diocese of Kakamega
Diocese of Kisii
Diocese of Kitale
Diocese of Lodwar

Ecclesiastical Province of Mombasa
Archdiocese of Mombasa
Diocese of Garissa
Diocese of Malindi

Ecclesiastical Province of Nairobi
Archdiocese of Nairobi
Diocese of Kericho
Diocese of Kitui
Diocese of Machakos
Diocese of Nakuru
Diocese of Ngong

Ecclesiastical Province of Nyeri
Archdiocese of Nyeri
Diocese of Embu
Diocese of Maralal
Diocese of Marsabit
Diocese of Meru
Diocese of Muranga
Diocese of Nyahururu

Episcopal Conference of Lesotho

Ecclesiastical Province of Maseru
Archdiocese of Maseru
Diocese of Mohale’s Hoek
Diocese of Qacha’s Nek

Episcopal Conference of Liberia

Ecclesiastical Province of Monrovia
Archdiocese of Monrovia
Diocese of Cape Palmas
Diocese of Gbarnga

Episcopal Conference of Madagascar

Ecclesiastical Province of Antananarivo
Archdiocese of Antananarivo
Diocese of Ambatondrazaka
Diocese of Antsirabe
Diocese of Miarinarivo
Diocese of Moramanga
Diocese of Tsiroanomandidy

Ecclesiastical Province of Antsiranana
Archdiocese of Antsiranana
Diocese of Ambanja
Diocese of Fenoarivo Atsinanana
Diocese of Mahajanga
Diocese of Port-Bergé
Diocese of Toamasina

Ecclesiastical Province of Fianarantsoa
Archdiocese of Fianarantsoa
Diocese of Ambositra
Diocese of Farafangana
Diocese of Ihosy
Diocese of Mananjary

Ecclesiastical Province of Toliara
Archdiocese of Toliara
Diocese of Morombe
Diocese of Morondava
Diocese of Tôlagnaro

Episcopal Conference of Malawi

Ecclesiastical Province of Blantyre
Archdiocese of Blantyre
Diocese of Chikwawa
Diocese of Mangochi
Diocese of Zomba

Ecclesiastical Province of Lilongwe
Archdiocese of Lilongwe
Diocese of Dedza
Diocese of Karonga
Diocese of Mzuzu

Episcopal Conference of Mali

Ecclesiastical Province of Bamako
Archdiocese of Bamako
Diocese of Kayes
Diocese of Mopti
Diocese of San
Diocese of Ségou
Diocese of Sikasso

Episcopal Conference of Mozambique

Ecclesiastical Province of Beira
Archdiocese of Beira
Diocese of Chimoio
Diocese of Gurué
Diocese of Quelimane
Diocese of Tete

Ecclesiastical Province of Maputo
Archdiocese of Maputo
Diocese of Inhambane
Diocese of Xai-Xai

Ecclesiastical Province of Nampula
Archdiocese of Nampula
Diocese of Lichinga
Diocese of Nacala
Diocese of Pemba

Episcopal Conference of Namibia

Ecclesiastical Province of Windhoek
Archdiocese of Windhoek
Diocese of Keetmanshoop
Vicariate of Rundu

Episcopal Conference of Niger

Ecclesiastical Province of Niamey
Archdiocese of Niamey
Diocese of Maradi

Episcopal Conference of Nigeria

Ecclesiastical Province of Abuja
Archdiocese of Abuja
Diocese of Idah
Diocese of Lafia
Diocese of Lokoja
Diocese of Makurdi
Diocese of Otukpo

Ecclesiastical Province of Benin City
Archdiocese of Benin City
Diocese of Auchi
Diocese of Issele-Uku
Diocese of Uromi
Diocese of Warri

Ecclesiastical Province of Calabar
Archdiocese of Calabar
Diocese of Ikot Ekpene
Diocese of Ogoja
Diocese of Port Harcourt
Diocese of Uyo

Ecclesiastical Province of Ibadan
Archdiocese of Ibadan
Diocese of Ekiti
Diocese of Ondo
Diocese of Osogbo
Diocese of Oyo

Ecclesiastical Province of Jos
Archdiocese of Jos
Diocese of Bauchi
Diocese of Jalingo
Diocese of Maiduguri
Diocese of Pankshin
Diocese of Shendam
Diocese of Yola

Ecclesiastical Province of Kaduna
Archdiocese of Kaduna
Diocese of Ilorin
Diocese of Kafanchan
Diocese of Kano
Diocese of Minna
Diocese of Sokoto
Diocese of Zaria

Ecclesiastical Province of Lagos
Archdiocese of Lagos
Diocese of Abeokuta
Diocese of Ijebu-Ode

Ecclesiastical Province of Onitsha
Archdiocese of Onitsha
Diocese of Abakaliki
Diocese of Awgu
Diocese of Awka
Diocese of Enugu
Diocese of Nnewi
Diocese of Nsukka

Ecclesiastical Province of Owerri
Archdiocese of Owerri
Diocese of Aba
Diocese of Ahiara
Diocese of Okigwe
Diocese of Orlu
Diocese of Umuahia

Episcopal Conference of Rwanda

Ecclesiastical Province of Kigali
Archdiocese of Kigali
Diocese of Butare
Diocese of Cyangugu
Diocese of Gikongoro
Diocese of Kabgayi
Diocese of Kibungo
Diocese of Nyundo
Diocese of Ruhengeri

Episcopal Conference of Senegal

Ecclesiastical Province of Dakar
Archdiocese of Dakar
Diocese of Kaolack
Diocese of Kolda
Diocese of Saint-Louis du Sénégal
Diocese of Tambacounda
Diocese of Thiès
Diocese of Ziguinchor

Episcopal Conference of Sierra Leone

Ecclesiastical Province of Freetown and Bo
Archdiocese of Freetown and Bo
Diocese of Kenema
Diocese of Makeni

Episcopal Conference of Southern Africa

Ecclesiastical Province of Bloemfontein
Archdiocese of Bloemfontein
Diocese of Bethlehem
Diocese of Keimoes-Upington
Diocese of Kimberley
Diocese of Kroonstad

Ecclesiastical Province of Cape Town
Archdiocese of Cape Town
Diocese of Aliwal
Diocese of De Aar
Diocese of Oudtshoorn
Diocese of Port Elizabeth
Diocese of Queenstown

Ecclesiastical Province of Durban
Archdiocese of Durban
Diocese of Dundee
Diocese of Eshowe
Diocese of Kokstad
Diocese of Mariannhill
Diocese of Umtata
Diocese of Umzimkulu

Ecclesiastical Province of Johannesburg
Archdiocese of Johannesburg
Diocese of Klerksdorp
Diocese of Manzini
Diocese of Witbank

Ecclesiastical Province of Pretoria
Archdiocese of Pretoria
Diocese of Pietersburg
Diocese of Rustenburg
Diocese of Tzaneen
Diocese of Francistown

Episcopal Conference of Sudan

Ecclesiastical Province of Juba
Archdiocese of Juba
Diocese of Malakal
Diocese of Rumbek
Diocese of Tombura-Yambio
Diocese of Torit
Diocese of Wau
Diocese of Yei

Ecclesiastical Province of Khartoum
Archdiocese of Khartoum
Diocese of El Obeid

Episcopal Conference of Tanzania

Ecclesiastical Province of Arusha
Archdiocese of Arusha
Diocese of Mbulu
Diocese of Moshi
Diocese of Same

Ecclesiastical Province of Dar-es-Salaam
Archdiocese of Dar-es-Salaam
Diocese of Dodoma
Diocese of Ifakara
Diocese of Kondoa
Diocese of Mahenge
Diocese of Morogoro
Diocese of Tanga
Diocese of Zanzibar

Ecclesiastical Province of Mbeya 
Archdiocese of Mbeya
Diocese of Iringa
Diocese of Sumbawanga

Ecclesiastical Province of Mwanza
Archdiocese of Mwanza
Diocese of Bukoba
Diocese of Bunda
Diocese of Geita
Diocese of Musoma
Diocese of Rulenge
Diocese of Shinyanga

Ecclesiastical Province of Songea
Archdiocese of Songea
Diocese of Lindi
Diocese of Mbinga
Diocese of Mtwara
Diocese of Njombe
Diocese of Tunduru-Masasi

Ecclesiastical Province of Tabora
Archdiocese of Tabora
Diocese of Kahama
Diocese of Kigoma
Diocese of Mpanda
Diocese of Singida

Episcopal Conference of Togo

Ecclesiastical Province of Lomé
Archdiocese of Lomé
Diocese of Aného
Diocese of Atakpamé
Diocese of Dapaong
Diocese of Kara
Diocese of Kpalimé
Diocese of Sokodé

Episcopal Conference of Uganda

Ecclesiastical Province of Gulu
Archdiocese of Gulu
Diocese of Arua
Diocese of Lira
Diocese of Nebbi

Ecclesiastical Province of Kampala
Archdiocese of Kampala
Diocese of Kasana–Luweero
Diocese of Kiyinda–Mityana
Diocese of Lugazi
Diocese of Masaka

Ecclesiastical Province of Mbarara
Archdiocese of Mbarara
Diocese of Fort Portal
Diocese of Hoima
Diocese of Kabale
Diocese of Kasese

Ecclesiastical Province of Tororo
Archdiocese of Tororo
Diocese of Jinja
Diocese of Kotido
Diocese of Moroto
Diocese of Soroti

Episcopal Conference of Zambia

Ecclesiastical Province of Kasama
Archdiocese of Kasama
Diocese of Mansa
Diocese of Mpika
Diocese of Mutare

Ecclesiastical Province of Lusaka
Archdiocese of Lusaka
Diocese of Chipata
Diocese of Kabwe
Diocese of Livingstone
Diocese of Mongu
Diocese of Monze
Diocese of Ndola
Diocese of Solwezi

Episcopal Conference of Zimbabwe

Ecclesiastical Province of Bulawayo
Archdiocese of Bulawayo
Diocese of Gweru
Diocese of Hwange
Diocese of Masvingo

Ecclesiastical Province of Harare
Archdiocese of Harare
Diocese of Chinhoyi
Diocese of Gokwe
Diocese of Mutare

Africa
Roman Catholic dioceses